A World of Peace Must Come is the debut album by American poet Stephen Kalinich. It was produced by Brian Wilson in August and September 1969. The album's release was delayed for several decades before being issued by Light in the Attic Records on October 6, 2008.

Background
The album is a collaboration between Brian Wilson and poet Stephen Kalinich dating from August and September 1969. It contains spoken word passages by Kalinich recorded in Brian's Los Angeles bedroom on August 22, 1969 with some instrumental accompaniment tracked later at Wally Heider Recording in Hollywood. In 1974, its recordings were assembled, but a record deal could not be found for it. It was finally given an official release on October 6, 2008.

Track listing

Note
"The Magic Hand" contains an excerpt of "Tears on My Pillow", sung by Marilyn Wilson and friends.

Personnel

Stephen John Kalinich – vocals, guitar on "The Deer, The Elk, The Raven"
Brian Wilson – vocals on "A World of Peace Must Come (intro)", background vocals on "The Magic Hand" and "Lonely Man", organ on "Be Still"
Mark Buckingham – 12-string guitar and arrangement on "Leaves of Grass"

Band on "America, I Know You"

Brian Wilson – arrangement
Diane Rovell – leader
Stella Castelucci – harp
Alan Estes – mallets, percussion
Jay Migliori – flute, clarinet
Tommy Morgan – harmonica
Ray Pohlman – bass
Stephen Paletta – atmosphere

References

2008 albums
Albums recorded at Wally Heider Studios
Albums produced by Brian Wilson
Brian Wilson albums
Stephen Kalinich albums